Raw Nerve may refer to:
 Raw Nerve (1990 film), a 1990 Australian film
 Raw Nerve (1991 film), an American psychological thriller
 Raw Nerve (1999 film), an American crime drama
 Raw Nerve (company), a film production company
 Shatner's Raw Nerve, a TV interview program
 Raw Nerve, an album by X Is Loaded